Thomas Urquhart (April 16, 1858 – February 16, 1931) was a Canadian politician and mayor of Toronto.

Early life 
Urquhart was born in Wallacetown, Dunwich Township, Elgin County, Ontario. His parents were Sarah McCallum and Alexander Cameron Urquhart, a pioneer tailor and storekeeper who immigrated from Dingwall, Ross and Cromarty, Scotland to Canada in 1847.

He attended public school in Wallacetown until he was 13 years old. He then spent years working with his father. At 21, he was appointed municipal clerk of the Township of Dunwich. Later, he became secretary of the Agricultural Society of West Elgin and secretary of the West Elgin Reform Association. 

He decided to enter law, and after passing the matriculation examination in 1881, he entered a law office in St. Thomas. In 1882 he entered a second law as a student. In 1886, he graduated from Osgoode Hall Law School as barrister and solicitor.

Career 
Urquhart entered into different law partnerships over the next many years. One partnership was with his brother Daniel Urquhart.

He took a strong role in civic affairs, and was elected alderman in Toronto’s Ward 4 in 1900 and re-elected in 1901-1902, prior to being elected to the mayor’s chair for three successive years. Thomas was elected mayor in 1903 over Oliver Howland and Daniel Lamb. In 1904 he was re-elected by acclamation, and in 1905 he defeated George Horace Gooderham.

A strong Liberal, he was chosen by his party to contest the riding of West Toronto for the legislature against Hon. Thomas Crawford. In 1904, he contested the riding of Toronto North for Parliament against Sir George Foster. In 1906, he ran unsuccessfully for the Ontario legislature against W. K. McNaught in Toronto North in a provincial byelection.

While he was mayor, he always guarded against encroachments of corporations to destroy the city’s sovereignty over its own streets. During that time, many applications were made by electric railway companies for franchises in adjoining municipalities, and it was feared the Toronto Street Railway Co. would acquire a perpetual franchise in Toronto. He watched every move made and succeeded in keeping Toronto free of entanglements.

He attended the first meeting in Berlin (now Kitchener) regarding the proposals to establish the hydroelectric system, and he also advocated public ownership of telephones. The Great Toronto fire of 1904 occurred during his time as mayor.

Personal life 
Urquhart was a leader in the Toronto Baptist community, active in both the Walmer Road Baptist Church and the Aurora Baptist Church. He was also a member of the Orange Order in Canada.

He was first married to Margaret S. McDonald of Peterborough, Ontario, who died in 1925. He married Mary Ellen Hall in 1927.

After becoming ill at his office, Urquhart was taken to his home at 136 Hillsdale Avenue in Toronto, where he died on February 16, 1931, from influenza. He was buried in Mount Pleasant Cemetery on February 18.

References

 Filey, Mike Mount Pleasant Cemetery (1990) Firefly Books 
 City of Toronto official website

1858 births
1931 deaths
People from Elgin County
Osgoode Hall Law School alumni
Canadian people of Scottish descent
Canadian Baptists
Mayors of Toronto
19th-century Canadian lawyers
20th-century Canadian lawyers
Lawyers in Ontario
Deaths from influenza
20th-century Canadian politicians